Denis Campbell was a Scottish Anglican priest in Ireland.

A Scotsman,  he became Archdeacon of Limerick in 1583 and Dean of Limerick in 1588. In 1603 he was nominated to the Sees of Derry, Clogher  and Raphoe

Notes

1603 deaths
Archdeacons of Limerick
Deans of Limerick
16th-century Scottish Episcopalian priests
16th-century Irish Anglican priests
17th-century Irish Anglican priests